Ethel is a New York based string quartet that was co-founded in 1998 by Ralph Farris, viola; Dorothy Lawson, cello; Todd Reynolds, violin; and Mary Rowell, violin. Unlike most string quartets, Ethel plays with amplification and integrates improvisation into its performances. The group's current membership includes violinists Kip Jones and Corin Lee.

Ethel performs original music as well as works by notable contemporary composers such as Julia Wolfe, John Zorn, Don Byron, Marcelo Zarvos, Pamela Z, Phil Kline, John King and many more. The group's 2004–2005 season culminated with a 45-city U.S. and European tour with the rock musicians Joe Jackson and Todd Rundgren, which included an appearance on Late Night with Conan O'Brien. Their 2005–2006 season included the Cantaloupe Music release of its second CD, Light, performances at BAM Next Wave Festival with choreographer Wally Cardona in New York, first-time performances in Miami (Florida), the Krannert Center for the Performing Arts in Champaign-Urbana, Illinois, performance at the new Experimental Media and Performing Arts Center at the Rensselaer Polytechnic Institute in Troy, New York as well as at the TED (Technology, Entertainment, Design) Conference, and a monthly residency at Joe's Pub. In 2008 Ethel worked with director Annie Dorsen to produce Ethel's TruckStop: The Beginning which was performed at BAM's Next Wave Festival. Months later, they offered another large scale performance, Wait for Green, presented by World Financial Center in the Winter Garden with choreographer Annie-B Parson. Ethel returned to the TED Conference in 2010 as the house band, performing with Thomas Dolby, David Byrne and Andrew Bird. They performed at Lincoln Center Out of Doors in the summer of 2010, collaborating with Juana Molina, Dayna Kurtz, Tom Verlaine, Patrick A. Derivaz, Mike Viola and Adam Schlesinger. In 2011, Ethel was an artist in residence at the Park Avenue Armory.

Members of the group performed or recorded with Bang on a Can, The Chamber Music Society of Lincoln Center, the Orpheus Chamber Orchestra, the New York Chamber Symphony, CONTINUUM, Sheryl Crow, Roger Daltrey, and Yo-Yo Ma's Silk Road Project.

In 2002 the string quartet founded Ethel's Foundation for the Arts, a nonprofit organization with a mission to support contemporary concert music with collaborative projects, commission of new works, and educational outreach. In keeping with this mission, Ethel has been the string quartet in residence since 2005 with the Native American Composers Apprenticeship Project (NACAP), an affiliate program of the Grand Canyon Music Festival, which is dedicated to teaching Native American young people to compose concert music. In 2011 NACAP was presented with a National Arts and Humanities Youth Program Award by First Lady Michelle Obama.

Ethel toured a program titled Tell Me Something Good with special guest Todd Rundgren in 2012. The program included Lou Harrison's Quartet Set, Herbie Hancock's Watermelon Man, a new commission, Octet 1979, by Judd Greenstein, Sunrise of the Planetary Dream Collector by Terry Riley, Spiegel im Spiegel by Arvo Pärt and Led Zeppelin's Kashmir, as well as an entire set of Todd Rundgren songs performed with Rundgren himself. Ethel is the current resident ensemble at the Metropolitan Museum's Balcony Bar Also this season, Ethel will present a multimedia program, Ethel's Documerica, celebrating the 40th anniversary of the Environmental Protection Agency's Documerica, launched in 1972. The program will feature new commissions from American composers; Jerod Impichchaachaaha' Tate, Ulysses Owens Jr., James "Kimo" Williams, and Mary Ellen Childs, and will include a visual component designed by visual artist Deborah Johnson. Ethel's Documerica will premier at the Park Avenue Armory as part of its Under Construction series. For a second consecutive year, the Jerome Foundation has announced support of Ethel's Foundation for the Arts HomeBaked program to commission new works from emerging New York City-based composers. Ethel has announced that this season's composers will be Hannis Brown, Lainie Fefferman, Dan Friel and Ulysses Owens, Jr., with works premiering in Spring 2013. In 2014 Denison University announced that Ethel will become their first ensemble in residence. In July 2016, Denison University announced that all four quartet members (Farris, Jones, Lawson and Lee) will receive honorary degrees, Doctor of Humane Letters, honoris causa. The degrees were awarded during the college’s 176th Commencement exercises on Saturday, May 13, 2017.

Discography

Recordings: Self Produced
 2003 – Ethel, with music by John King, Phil Kline, Todd Reynolds and Evan Ziporyn, Cantaloupe Music
 2006 – Light, with music by Timo Alakotila, Don Byron, Mary Ellen Childs, Einstein the African grey parrot, Lennie Tristano, Pamela Z and Marcelo Zarvos, Cantaloupe Music
 2012 – Heavy, with music by Don Byron, John Halle, Julia Wolfe, John King, Raz Mesinai, David Lang, Kenji Bunch and Marcelo Zarvos, Innova Recordings
2015 –  Documerica, with music by Mary Ellen Childs, Ralph Farris, Kip Jones, Dorothy Lawson, Ulysses Owens Jr., Jerod Impichchaachaaha Tate, Tema Watstein and James Kimo Williams, Innova Recordings

Recordings: Featured Artist
 2000 – Downtown Documents: Hazardous Materials, VHS, live concert, Context Studios
 2001 – Mel Graves: Day of Love, Mutable Music
 2001 – Muhal Richard Abrams: The Visibility of Thought, Mutable Music
 2003 – Julia Wolfe: The String Quartets, Cantaloupe Music
 2004 – Lukas Ligeti: Mystery System, Tzadik
 2005 – Neil Rolnick: Shadow Quartet, Innova Records
 2005 – Here This Now: Cantaloupe Music Sampler on "Sweet Hardwood" by John King
 2006 – TED 2006: The Future We Will Create, DVD/CD, TED
 2006 – John King: AllSteel, Tzadik
 2006 – Mary Ellen Childs: Dream House, Innova Recordings
 2007 – A Sampler From Cantaloupe Music on "Also Sprach Einstein" by Mary Rowell
 2007 – For New Orleans, Benefit compilation CD including artists Jeff Buckley, Indigo Girls, Natalie Merchant, Marshall Crenshaw, Dan Wilson, the Jayhawks and more, Sugarfoot Music
 2008 – Douglas J. Cuomo: Arjuna's Dilemma, Innova Recordings
 2008 – Joshua Rosenblum: Sundry Notes on "Will You Please Be Serious?", Albany Records
 2009 – Phil Kline: Around the World in a Daze on "Svarga Yatra", Starkland
 2009 – Phil Kline: John the Revelator, with the vocal ensemble Lionheart, Cantaloupe Music
 2010 – Oshtali: Music for String Quartet by Chickasaw String Composers
 2010 – NYFA Collection: 25 Years of New York Music, Innova Recordings
 2011 – Neil Rolnick: Extended Family, Innova Recordings
 2012 – Anna Clyne: Blue Moth on "Roulette", Tzadik
 2012 – Cold Blue Two, various artists, on "Sky with Four Suns" by John Luther Adams, Cold Blue Music
 2014 – Jerome Kitzke, The Paha Sapa Give-Back on "Winter Count", Innova
 2014 – Hafez Modirzadeh, In Convergence Liberation, Pi Recordings
 2021 – Joe Jackson, Todd Rundgren, State Theater New Jersey 2005, Purple Pyramid

Recordings: Guest Artist
 2000 – Joe Jackson: Night and Day II, Sony
 2002 – Dayna Kurtz: Postcards From Downtown, Kismet/Mri
 2004 – Dayna Kurtz: Beautiful Yesterday, Kismet/Mri
 2007 – Soundtrack Dan in Real Life, Capitol Records
 2007 – Mudville: Iris Nova, Slurry Records
 2007 – Eric Starr Group: She
 2008 – Room Eleven: Mmm... Gumbo?, Universal Music Group
 2009 – Kurt Elling: Dedicated to You: Kurt Elling Sings the Music of Coltrane and Hartman, Concord Records, 2010, live concert recording Grammy Award for Best Jazz Vocal Album
 2011 – Thomas Dolby: A Map of the Floating City, on "Love Is A Loaded Pistol"
 2012 – Joe Jackson: The Duke, Razor & Tie
 2012 – Kaki King: Glow, Velour Recordings, on "Great Round Burn" and "The Fire Eater"
 2015 – Kaki King: The Neck Is a Bridge to the Body, Short Stuff Records,  on "Trying to Speak I" and "Trying to Speak II"
 2020 - Svjetlana Bukvich, EXTENSION, "Once You Are Not A Stranger", Navona Records

Recordings: Film and Television
 2000 – Steve Oscar Moore: The Indescribable Nth, animated film with score by Bennie Wallace, Character Builders
 2004 – Deadwood Pilot Episode, on track "Shuffle" by composer John King, HBO
 2007 – Susan Todd: The Mother Is the One Who Stretches, score by Ethel, Archipelago Films
 2008 – John Turner: Soundtrack You Belong to Me, CD Baby
 2008 – Jehane Noujaim: Pangea Day Trailer, score by Ethel, TED
 2009 – Christopher North: Soundtrack Everything's Jake, Chris Fetchko Films
 2009 – Stewart Wallace: Soundtrack Daylight
 2009 – Ela Orleans: Zodiac, scary cue, BMI
 2010 – Danièle Wilmouth: Eleanor & the Timekeeper, score by Ethel, Hairless Films
 2010 – Christopher North: Soundtrack Eavesdrop, CD Baby/INDYS
 2010 – Lee Brooks: 2010 Oslo Freedom Forum Soundtrack, Lee Brooks Media
 2010 – Jim Rivett: Westbound, Various Artists, on track "Hobo Soup" with Jill Sobule
 2011 – Molly McBride: Strings on the Rez, PBS
 2012 – Tom Schroeder: Marcel, King of Tevuren, animated film with score from "The Blue Room and Other Stories" by composer Phil Kline

References

External links
 
 

Musical groups established in 1998
American instrumental musical groups
Contemporary classical music ensembles
American string quartets
Musical groups from New York City